Chuzhya is a rural locality (a village) in Yurlinskoye Rural Settlement, Yurlinsky District, Perm Krai, Russia. The population was 183 as of 2010. There are 4  streets.

Geography 
Chuzhya is located 14 km north of Yurla (the district's administrative centre) by road. Loinskaya is the nearest rural locality.

References 

Rural localities in Yurlinsky District